Wicked Twisted Road is the fourth studio album by Red Dirt artist Reckless Kelly. It was released on February 8, 2005.

Track listing
All songs written by Willy Braun, except where noted

"Wicked Twisted Road" - 3:25
"Dogtown" - 3:35 (Willy & Micky Braun)
"Seven Nights in Eire" (Bennett, Braun, Braun) - 3:17
"A Lot to Ask" - 2:45
"Motel Cowboy Show" (Abeyta, Braun, Braun) 5:37
"These Tears" - 2:43
"Sixgun" - 6:05
"Nobody Haunts Me Like You" (Braun, Kennedy) - 3:29
"Wretched Again" (Abeyta, Braun, Kennedy) - 3:19
"Broken Heart" - 3:11
"Stick Around" - 3:59
"Baby's Got a Whole Lot More" - 2:45
"Wicked Twisted Road" (Reprise) - 6:10

Radio singles 
"Baby's Got a Whole Lot More"— peaked at #6 on the Texas Music Chart
"Stick Around"— peaked at #5 on the Texas Music Chart
"These Tears"— peaked at #6 on the Texas Music Chart

Chart positions

References

2005 albums
Reckless Kelly (band) albums